Tomb of the Lost Queen is the 26th installment in the Nancy Drew point-and-click adventure game series by Her Interactive. The game is available for play on Microsoft Windows and Mac OS X platforms. It has an ESRB rating of E for moments of mild violence. Players take on the first-person view of fictional amateur sleuth Nancy Drew and must solve the mystery through interrogation of suspects, solving puzzles, and discovering clues. There are two levels of gameplay, Amateur and Master sleuth modes, each offering a different difficulty level of puzzles and hints, however neither of these changes affect the actual plot of the game. The game is loosely based on a book entitled Secrets of the Nile (1995).

Plot
60 years ago, a violent sandstorm uncovered an ancient tomb in the desert outside Cairo. A British expedition set off in hope of finally finding Egypt's legendary Lost Queen. The expedition never returned. The explorers were lost and presumed dead. In the present day, Nancy Drew joins leading archaeologists as they unearth what they presume to be the tomb where the British explorers were lost. The site is rumored to be cursed, due to an increase in suspicious accidents. The site's lead archaeologist, Professor Jon Boyle, was attacked during a fierce sandstorm and sent to the hospital to recover. As an amateur detective, Nancy attempts to discover who attacked Professor Boyle as well as what happened to the previous expedition.

Development

Characters 
Nancy Drew - Nancy is an 18-year-old amateur detective from the fictional town of River Heights in the United States. She is the only playable character in the game, which means the player must solve the mystery from her perspective.
Abdullah Bakhoum - Abdullah is the Egyptian-assigned liaison to the Kingston dig team. He's famous in the Egyptology world for both his discoveries and his strong personality. Though he's tried for years, he hasn't yet been able to attain a high-ranking position in the field and is determined to get what he wants. Could his passion for discovery and need for limelight be the fuel behind the strange accidents?
Lily Crewe - Lily is an Egyptology PhD student from Kingston University who is on her very first expedition. Archaeology is her passion and she's beyond thrilled to be part of this dig. She wants to find the mummy, but doesn't know exactly what she should be doing. She's also in awe of Abdullah, but petrified of displeasing him. Her desire for leadership and clear inexperience makes her look suspicious.
Jamila El-Dine - Jamila is a local Egyptian who was absolutely thrilled when the temple was discovered just outside her town. She loves ancient Egypt and is a firm believer that the aliens built the pyramids. Jamila spends much of her time sneaking around in the shadows. What does she really believe and why is she really here?
Dylan Carter - British tour guide Dylan is charismatic, knowledgeable and friendly. He's also crashing a dig site. Carter claims that tourists will come to the tomb when they hear about the curse, which might imply that he is betting his financial future on more misfortune for the team. If Carter can't bank on a natural accident, would he go to the trouble of creating one?

Cast
Nancy Drew - Lani Minella
Abdullah Bakhoum - Dave Rivas
Lily Crewe - Marianna DeFazio
Dylan Carter - Gabriel Wolf
Jamila El-Dine - Sofia Rybin
Jon Boyle - Mark Waldstein
Professor Beatrice Hotchkiss - Keri Healey
Bess Marvin - Jennifer Pratt
Miscellaneous Voices - Bill Corkery

References 

2012 video games
Detective video games
Video games based on Nancy Drew
Point-and-click adventure games
Video games developed in the United States
Video games scored by Kevin Manthei
Video games set in Egypt
Windows games
MacOS games
Her Interactive games
Single-player video games
North America-exclusive video games